Happy Valley-Goose Bay (Inuit: Vâli) is a town in the province of Newfoundland and Labrador, Canada.

Located in the central part of Labrador on the coast of Lake Melville and the Churchill River, Happy Valley-Goose Bay is the largest population centre in that region with an estimated 8,109 residents in 2016. Incorporated in 1973, it comprises the former town of Happy Valley and the Local Improvement District of Goose Bay. Built on a large sandy plateau in 1941, the town is home to the largest military air base in northeastern North America, CFB Goose Bay.

History
In the summer of 1941, Eric Fry, an employee of the Canadian Department of Mines and Resources on loan to the Royal Canadian Air Force, selected a large sandy plateau near the mouth of the Goose River to build the Goose Bay Air Force Base. Docking facilities for transportation of goods and personnel were built at Terrington Basin.

Goose Air Base became a landing and refuelling stop for the Atlantic Ferry route. Soon after the site was selected, men from the coast of Labrador began working on the base. With World War II in bloom, it took only five months to build an operational military airport on the leased territory.

The first settlers to the area came from coastal Labrador to work with McNamara Construction Company, which was contracted to build the Goose Bay Air Force Base. Their first choice was Otter Creek, where they were told that it would have been too close to the base. A new location was chosen based upon the requirement to be at least five miles (8 km) from the base. In 1942, a new site was chosen that was first called Refugee Cove; it was not until 1955 that it eventually was renamed Happy Valley.

The first three families to arrive to work at the construction of the base were the Saunders from Davis Inlet, the Broomfields from Big Bay, and the Perraults from Makkovik.

Happy Valley's first school was operated by a Mrs. Perrault from her home until 1946, when the Royal Canadian Air Force donated a building. The old one-room school was bought by Bella and Clarence Brown in early 1962 and turned into a family residence. In 1949, the Air Force donated a second building which became the North Star School. Mrs. Perrault became Happy Valley's first librarian also. Bella Brown took over as Happy Valley's librarian when the North Star School's second building was donated as the new library.

The Grenfell Mission operated the first medical facilities when it opened a nursing station in 1951.  In 1963, the provincial government built Paddon Memorial Hospital.

Geography
Happy Valley-Goose Bay lies at the southwest end of Lake Melville near the mouth of the Churchill River. The town is located on the southern shore of a peninsula created by Terrington Basin to the north and Goose Bay at the south.

Climate
Summer highs, on the other hand, average . The average high temperature stays below freezing for five months of the year and the low does so for eight months.

Canadian Forces Base 

CFB Goose Bay saw a reduction of NATO low-level tactical flight training in the decade 1996–2005, and the town faced an uncertain future as the federal government reduced the number of permanent Royal Canadian Air Force personnel to fewer than 100 all-ranks. The last NATO nations to use CFB Goose Bay for flight training, Germany and Italy, did not renew their leases after terminating in early 2006.

The runway at Happy Valley-Goose Bay was also an alternative, but unused, landing site for the now-decommissioned NASA Space Shuttle, because of its size and length.

Local Improvement District of Goose Bay 
Prior to its amalgamation with Happy Valley, the Local Improvement District of Goose Bay was set up in 1970 and included an area called Spruce Park and the Canadian Department of Transport Housing areas. It grew to include other areas of the base until 1973, when it comprised all of the base area.

Demographics

The 2011 census showed that Happy Valley-Goose Bay has outgrown Labrador City and is now the largest community in Labrador. However, Labrador West (a region consisting of Labrador City and a nearby community, Wabush) still has a higher population than Upper Lake Melville (which includes Happy Valley-Goose Bay and 3 nearby communities)

Transportation

Road 
Happy Valley and Goose Bay are connected by the Trans-Labrador Highway with Labrador City and Baie-Comeau in Quebec. The road was extended south to link with an existing road from the Blanc Sablon-St Barbe ferry. It opened in December 2009.

Prior to 1954, hardly any licence plates were issued to Labrador communities except for Happy Valley and the Goose Bay area. A series of small plates were issued to help fund road development. It was not until the mid-1960s that all of Labrador started using regular Newfoundland licence plates.

Since 1992, the road from Baie-Comeau to Wabush was connected to an open route year-round to Happy Valley-Goose Bay.

Water 
The town was serviced by boat and container ship to the ports from Newfoundland and the port of Montreal. Most of the town's supplies were transported by container vessels brought to the docking facilities located at Terrington Basin. These facilities were operated by Transport Canada. The shipping season usually lasted from June to December. In the summer, a ferry service connects Happy Valley-Goose Bay with Cartwright.

Air 
Air Canada and Eastern Provincial Airways were the first air carriers in the area to carry passengers from outside the area into CFB Goose Bay. Labrador Airways Limited provided air transportation to local communities. Located at Otter Creek is a seaplane base that also provided airlifts to local communities and tourist lodges in the interior of Labrador.

Notable residents
 Jennifer Hale, voice actress
 Heather Igloliorte, historian
 Seamus O'Regan, politician
 Keith Russell, politician
 Doris Saunders, archivist

See also
 List of cities and towns in Newfoundland and Labrador

References
 Newfoundland's Namescape Unpublished manuscript, Floreen Carter, Phelps Publishing, London Ont.

External links

Official website

Towns in Newfoundland and Labrador
Populated places in Labrador
Populated places established in 1941
1941 establishments in Canada